The Scottish Power Company Limited was an electricity industry holding company that operated from 1909 until 1948. Its subsidiary companies generated and supplied electricity to up to 136,800 consumers in an area of 13,000 square miles over large parts of Scotland.

Foundation 
The Scottish Power Company Limited was incorporated in 1909. Its sole subsidiary at that time was the Scottish Central Electric Power Company which had been established in 1903 under the terms of the Scottish Central Electric Power Act 1903 (3 Edw. 7 ccxli). The Central Company had constructed and operated a power station at Bonnybridge near Falkirk.

Management 
The Scottish Power company's management board in 1927 comprised: Henry Brown (chairman); George Balfour; J.W. Bowhill; Sir T.O. Callender; and Ian C.A. Murray.

In 1937 the board comprised: George Balfour (chairman); Alexander H. Bowhill; Sir T.O. Callender; Ian C.A. Murray; and Kenneth Sanderson. George Balfour died in September 1941 and was succeeded as chairman by William Shearer who remained chairman until 1948.

The company's registered office was 10 Melville Street, Edinburgh.

Subsidiary Companies 
The Scottish Power Company went on to acquire the shares and capital of other Scottish electricity undertakings. By 1927 these included:

 Scottish Midlands Electricity Supply Limited
 Grampian Electricity Supply Limited
 North of Scotland Electric Light and Power Company Limited
 Crief Electric Supply Company Limited
 Dunblane and District Electricity Supply Limited

By 1930 the Scottish Power Company had also acquired:

 Fife Electric Power Company
 Arbroath Electric Light and Power Company Limited
 Beauly Electric Supply Company Limited
 Duncan's Electricity Supply Company Limited

By 1937 its subsidiaries also included:

 Elgin Electric Supply Company Limited
 Grantown-on-Spey Electric Supply Company Limited
 Ross-shire Electric Supply Company Limited
 Scottish Southern Electric Supply Company Limited
 Strichen Electrical Supply Company Limited

By 1948 the Power Company had absorbed 21 electricity undertakings and had made arrangements for the acquisition of nine other undertakings. However, these arrangements were abandoned as a consequence of the nationalization of the electricity industry. The Scottish Power Company was dissolved and its power stations and power lines were vested in the South East Scotland Electricity Board.

Power stations 
The engineering details of the power stations operated by the subsidiary companies in 1921 were as follows:

In 1946 the following subsidiary companies and their power stations were operational.

Operations 1910–1948 
Outline operational details of the Scottish Power Company over its lifetime are summarised in the table. The data demonstrates the significant growth of the company.

Individual power stations continued to operate following nationalisation. These Included Dunfermline (25.4 MW); Bonnybridge (37 MW); and Galashiels (6.625 MW).

Financial 
The capital available to the company is shown on the table above. The net profit (£1000) from the company's operations is shown on the graph.

Dissolution 
Under the terms of the Electricity Act 1947 the British electricity was nationalized on 1 April 1948. The Scottish Power Company was dissolved and its infrastructure such as power stations and power lines were vested in the South East Scotland Electricity Board.

See also 

 South of Scotland Electricity Board
 North of Scotland Hydro-electric Board
 List of power stations in Scotland

References 

Defunct companies of Scotland
Energy in Scotland
Electric power in Scotland
1948 disestablishments in Scotland
British companies disestablished in 1948
Electric power companies of Scotland